Lusaka Dynamos Football Club is a Zambian football club based in Lusaka. Lusaka Dynamos Football Club is a Zambian football club based in Lusaka. The club's nickname is "The Elite" and it lives up to its billing by way of the profile it commands in the media and general public. Lusaka Dynamos plays in the top division of the Football Association of Zambia league, called the Zambia Super League. The club colours are: Home colours – Red with white highlighters and Away colours are White with red highlighter or Gray with crazy green highlighter or Orange with black. The kit brand is currently Umbro having been dressed by Macron for the last 2 seasons. Before that, the club was dressed by a local sports brand Yesu. 

Lusaka Dynamos is renowned for its ability to nurture upcoming footballers into fully-fledged players. The club's President is Hanif Adam – a businessman and experienced administrator. All home games are played at National Heroes Stadium in Lusaka. The main sponsor of Lusaka Dynamos is businessman Bokani Soko.

History
The club was formed in 1979 by Hanif Adam who was a popular DJ around Lusaka nightclubs. He was also a part time player at the club, which slowly evolved into one that focused on giving youths from different communities opportunities, and then later sell them on.

Lusaka Dynamos has sold players to destinations including Germany, Israel, and South Africa. A number of former Zambia National Team players trace their roots to the club.

Lusaka Dynamos has also given opportunities to footballers who arrived as refugees in Zambia to revive their careers at the club, with a number coming from Rwanda and Liberia. The club a few years ago decided to change its strategy in a bid to compete for honors. The club has recently signed several star players from across Africa, as well as identifying potential stars of the Zambian game. Of late, the club has made a name by signing up some of the great talent from around Africa and has even had layers from as far as Brazil on its rooster.

Lusaka Dynamos have yet to win a league title with its best position being 5th in 2017 while the club won its one and only trophy in the 2008 BP Top 8 Cup after beating Zesco United 1–0 in the final. LD remains the reigning BP Top 8 Champion as the competition has not been held since. LD also beat ZESCO in the final of the 2021 to be the reigning ABSA Cup (Zambia) champions.

Achievements
Zambian Challenge Cup: 1
2008
ABSA Cup: 1
2021

Club Officials
President:   Hanif Adams
Club Patron:  Patrick Kangwa
Chief Executive Officer:   Meeth Naik
Club Secretary:   Twambo Phiri
Executive Committee Member:   Richard Phiri
Club Lawyer:  Kennedy Mambwe
Business Development Manager:  Ntinda Kandeke
Sales Executive:  Stephen Tom Phiri

Management Staff
Senior Team Manager:   Francis Bwalya
Youth Team Manager:  Brian Sapi
Technical/Corporate Affairs Manager:  Shalala Oliver Sepiso

Technical Staff
Head Coach:  Patrick Phiri
First Assistant Coach:  Christopher 'Gazza' Tembo
Assistant Coach:  Ronald Mukosha
Physical Trainer:  Manchi Janza
Goalkeeping Coach:  Stephen Mwansa
Head Youth Coach:  Ian Bakala
Youth Coach:  Josphat Nkhoma

Administrative and Support Staff
Team Doctor:  Komani Munthali
Senior Physiotherapist:  Gift Nyambe
Physiotherapist:  Sam Siatalimi
Kit Master:  Joseph Zeka Mbuti
Assistant Kit Master:  Kika Musimbi
Transport Officer:  Kennedy Zulu
Security Officer:  Peter Namusiya
Fans Coordinator:  Sosten Daka

2019 squad

References

Football clubs in Zambia
Sport in Lusaka